The table below shows all known compositions by Edward Elgar.

Compositions 
Works are shown in opus number order (Opp. 1–90), followed by those without opus number, in date order (1867–1933). The list includes incomplete and unpublished works.

Notes

References

External links
 
 

Elgar